Ivesia santolinoides is a species of flowering plant in the rose family known by the common names silver mousetail, stellariopsis, Sierra mousetail and mousetail ivesia. It is endemic to California where it grows in several mountain ranges, including the Sierra Nevada and Transverse Ranges.

This is a perennial herb which can be somewhat different in appearance from many other mousetails. Each leaf is made up of many leaflets but they are tiny and overlap tightly to form a woolly, taillike, cylindrical leaf up to 10 centimeters long. The erect, naked stem reaches up to 40 centimeters in height and bears an inflorescence of flowers. Each flower is up to 8 millimeters wide and has large, round white petals above the much smaller, pointed sepals. There are 15 stamens and a single pistil.

References

External links
Photo gallery

santolinoides
Endemic flora of California
Flora of the Sierra Nevada (United States)
Flora without expected TNC conservation status